The M42 motorway runs north east from Bromsgrove in Worcestershire to just south west of Ashby-de-la-Zouch in Leicestershire, passing Redditch, Solihull, the National Exhibition Centre (NEC) and Tamworth on the way, serving the east of the Birmingham metropolitan area. The section between the M40 and junction 4 of the M6 forms – though unsigned as such – a part of Euroroute E05. Northwards beyond junction 11, the route is continued as the A42; the junctions on this section, 12–14, are numbered like a continuation of the motorway, but the road has non-motorway status from here.

History

Planning and construction
Plans for a new motorway by-passing the south and east of Birmingham, reaching Tamworth and connecting the M5 and M6 motorways, were announced in 1972.

The first section opened in November 1976 linking Birmingham Airport with the M6 motorway.

The curve around the south-eastern side of Solihull opened in September 1985 followed by the section from the M6 with the A5 at Tamworth in December 1985. The southern section of the motorway to Alvechurch just north of Redditch to form a junction with the A441 and from A5 at Tamworth with the A444 at Measham opened in 1986.

A planned section north of the M6 running to the M1 near Nottingham was never constructed as planned being replaced by the A42 link, a trunk road which was completed in August 1989 to link with the M1 motorway near Nottingham.

When first built, there was no direct connection between the M5 South and M42. Westbound M42 traffic similarly had no direct connection to the M5 North. Instead traffic had to use the A38 between M5 Junction 4 and M42 Junction 1.

Operational history
Junction 3a was remodelled to give priority to traffic operating between the now westbound section of the M42 and the extended M40 motorway, which opened in stages between December 1989 and January 1991. The section of M42 between the M40 (J3A) and the M5 (J4A) was scheduled to be re-designated as an extension of the M40 at the same time, but this re-designation never took place.

The section of the M42 between Junctions 7A and 9 was re-built as part of the M6 Toll works and now forms the link between the M6 and the southern end of the toll road. The M6 Toll opened in 2003.

Active Traffic Management with hard shoulder running and variable speed limits were introduced in 2006.

Since the 1980s, there have been constant plans to build a new service station on the motorway south of Birmingham Airport and the NEC, but this has yet to be built.

Features

Birmingham Outer Ring Road

Along with sections of the M5 and M6, the southern sections of the M42 form the Birmingham Outer Ring Road motorway around Birmingham.  Much like the M25 around London, and the M60 around Manchester, there are areas where this orbital system does not work well.  One such point is junction 3A, the link between the M42 and the M40, where traffic is often heavy in the rush hour. The intersection between the M42 and M6 is often very busy too, especially when travelling along the M6.

Managed motorways and Active Traffic Management
Active Traffic Management (ATM) was launched as a pilot scheme on the M42 operating between junction 3a and 7 with mandatory variable speed limits, hard shoulder running, better driver information signs and a new incident management system. This system allows operators to open and close any lane to traffic in order to help manage congestion or an incident. Between 2006 and 2007, journey times have decreased by 26% northbound and 9% southbound and journey time variability has decreased by 27%. Due to the success of the trial this system was later extended northbound to junction 9 of the M42 (and onto the adjacent M6 to Junction 5) and southbound along the M40 to Junction 15 as part of the first phase of a nationwide roll out of the rebranded 'Managed motorways; concept.

Incidents and accidents
A collision involving 160 vehicles occurred on 10 March 1997 in fog in Bromsgrove, Worcestershire which resulted in three deaths and 60 injuries.

Junctions

Data from driver location signs are used to provide distance and carriageway identifier information. If a junction extends over several hundred metres and both start and end points are known, both are shown.

{| style="margin-left:1em; margin-bottom:1em; color:black;" class="wikitable"
|-  style="background:#0079C1; text-align:center; color:white; font-size:120%;"
| colspan="6" | M42 motorway junctions
|-  style="background:#000; text-align:center; color:white;"
| mile
| km
| Southbound exits (A carriageway)
| Junction
| Northbound exits (B carriageway)
| Coordinates
|- style="text-align:center;"
| 0.00.9
| 0.0  1.4
| The North West, Birmingham (W, N & C), Stourbridge, (M6) M5(N)The South West, Worcester M5(S)
| M5 J4A 
| Start of motorway
| 
|- style="text-align:center;"
|1.41.6
|2.3  2.6
| Bromsgrove A38
|J1
| No access (on-slip only)
| 
|- style="text-align:center;"
|5.66.0
|9.0  9.6
| Birmingham (S) A441Hopwood Park services
|J2Services
| Birmingham (S) A441Hopwood Park services
| 
|- style="text-align:center;"
|8.4
|13.5
| style=background:skyblue | Entering Worcestershire
|rowspan=2|J3
| Birmingham (S), Redditch, Evesham A435
|rowspan=2| 
|- style="text-align:center;"
|8.8
|14.1
| Birmingham (S), Redditch, Evesham A435
| style=background:skyblue | Entering Warwickshire
|- style="text-align:center;"
|11.712.2
|18.8  19.7
| End of variable speed limit 
|rowspan=2|J3A(TOTSO NB)
| Start of variable speed limit 
|rowspan=2| 
|- style="text-align:center;"
|
|
| London, Warwick, Stratford M40
| London, Warwick, Stratford M40
|- style="text-align:center;"
|
|
| style=background:skyblue | Entering Warwickshire
|
| style=background:skyblue | Entering West Midlands
| 
|- style="text-align:center;"
|14.214.5
|22.8  23.3
| Shirley A34
|J4
| Shirley A34
| 
|- style="text-align:center;"
|16.516.9
|26.6  27.2
| Solihull A41
|J5
| Solihull A41
| 
|- style="text-align:center;"
|19.920.3
|32.1  32.7
| Birmingham (E), Birmingham International , Birmingham , National Exhibition Centre, Coventry A45
|J6
|  Birmingham (E), Birmingham International , Birmingham , National Exhibition Centre A45(W)
Coventry (S & W), N.E.C. A45(E)
| 
|- style="text-align:center;"
|22.122.6
|35.6  36.4
|  No access (on-slip only)
| J7 
| The North West, Birmingham (C & N) M6(N)
| 
|- style="text-align:center;"
|
|
| style=background:skyblue | Entering West Midlands
|
| style=background:skyblue | Entering Warwickshire
| 
|- style="text-align:center;"
|22.722.9
|36.6  36.8
|  No access
|rowspan=2| J7A(TOTSO SB)
| London (M1), Coventry M6
| 
|- style="text-align:center;"
|
|
| London (N & E) (M1), Coventry (N & E) M6
|  No access (on-slip only)
| 
|- style="text-align:center;"
|24.5
|39.4
| Birmingham (Central, E, N & W) M6(N)
| J8
|  No access (on-slip only)
| 
|- style="text-align:center;"
|
|
|  No access (on slip only)
|rowspan=3|J9
| The North West, Cannock, Lichfield M6 Toll
| 
|- style="text-align:center;"
|rowspan=2 | 26.7
|rowspan=2 | 42.9
| Start of variable speed limit 
| Kingsbury A4097, Lichfield A446
|rowspan=2 | 
|- style="text-align:center;"
| The North West M6 Toll, Coleshill A446, A4097
| End of variable speed limit 
|- style="text-align:center;"
|32.4
|52.2
| Nuneaton, Tamworth A5, Lichfield (A38)Tamworth services
| J10Services
| Nuneaton, Tamworth A5Tamworth services
| 
|- style="text-align:center;"
|
|
| style=background:skyblue | Entering Warwickshire
|
| style=background:skyblue | Entering Leicestershire
| 
|- style="text-align:center;"
|39.7
|63.9
| Start of motorway 
| rowspan=2|J11 Services
| Burton upon Trent, Measham A444
| 
|- style="text-align:center;"
|40.0
|64.4
| Nuneaton A444Non-motorway traffic
| End of motorway Road continues as A42 towards East Midlands Airport
| 
|-
|colspan=6|Notes
Distances in kilometres and carriageway identifiers are obtained from driver location signs/location marker posts. Where a junction spans several hundred metres and the data is available, both the start and finish values for the junction are shown. 
|-

Coordinate list

See also
List of motorways in the United Kingdom
:Category:M42 motorway service stations

References

External links

 CBRD Motorway Database – M42
 The Motorway Archive – M42

Motorways in England
Transport in Leicestershire
Roads in Warwickshire
M4-0042
Roads in the West Midlands (county)